Kevin P. Coughlin is a photojournalist, writer, governmental photographer, pilot, and aerial cinematographer. He is the former executive photographer to New York Governor Kathy Hochul and to New York's previous Governor Andrew M. Cuomo.  His photographs at Ground Zero following the September 11, 2001 attacks on the World Trade Center and while covering funerals and memorial services of fallen fire fighters, police officers, and emergency personnel killed as a result of the attacks are included in the 2002 Pulitzer Prize awarded to The New York Times for Public Service. In addition to The New York Times, his photographs have appeared in the New York Post, New York Daily News, Newsday, The Philadelphia Inquirer, The Los Angeles Times, Bloomberg News, Business Week, People, Sports Illustrated, Rolling Stone, Time, USA Today and The Wall Street Journal. He has also written magazine articles for GQ and News Photographer.

Early life
Coughlin grew up in the Long Island, New York suburb of Farmingdale. He attended  St. John's University in Jamaica, Queens, NY in the mid to late 1980s where he studied photography, journalism and mass communications. Coughlin also served as a staff photographer and photo editor of St. John's student newspaper, The Torch During his senior year, he interned as a photographer for Newsday in Melville, New York. After graduation, he worked as a freelance photographer for Newsday, the Associated Press, United Press International, and for The National Sports Daily under legendary sports photographer Neil Leifer. On August 15, 1991, Coughlin persuaded an HBO camera crew to allow him in a cherry picker for an aerial shot of an estimated crowd of 750,000 people attending a free concert by Paul Simon in New York's Central Park. Simon saw the photograph a week later in Newsweek and contacted Coughlin to use the image for his album and video release: Paul Simon's Concert in the Park, August 15, 1991.

Career
Coughlin landed his first staff photographer job with the Asbury Park Press in Neptune, New Jersey in late 1991. Two years later, he accepted a staff photographer position with New Jersey's largest newspaper, The Star-Ledger of Newark.  In August 1994 while covering the Woodstock '94 Music and Arts Festival in Saugerties, New York, he was informed by telephone that he no longer had a job. Upon returning from Woodstock, he quickly found work freelancing for the New York Daily News and the New York Post where he remained a full-time photographer until the late 1990s.

Around 1999, Coughlin made the transition from 35mm film to Digital Single Lens Reflex cameras, one of the first independent photojournalists to do so, and began freelancing for The New York Times. In 2002, he was honored for his visual contributions to The New York Times Pulitzer Prize–winning series: "A Nation Challenged". His work later appeared in two Times-published books: PORTRAITS 9/11/01 and A Nation Challenged: A Visual History of 9/11 and its Aftermath. The New York Times won the 2002 Pulitzer Prizes in the Breaking News Photography, Feature Photography and Public Service categories. Coughlin was a team member for the latter grouping.

In 2004 Coughlin returned to the New York Post as a sports photographer and weekend photo editor. He covered mostly professional sporting events and led the Post'''s coverage for Super Bowl XLII in 2009 and the World Series, also in 2009. He also worked on personal projects, such as traveling to Vatican City to cover the funeral of Pope John Paul II in 2005. In 2008, he covered the Papal Visit to New York City by Pope Benedict XVI and was an on-field pool photographer for a Papal Mass held at the original Yankee Stadium on April 20, 2008.

Come July 2008 Coughlin left the New York Post to become the Director of Photography for former New York Mets and Philadelphia Phillies all-star Lenny Dykstra's financial magazine for professional athletes, The Players Club, but that did not last long. After only 67 days Coughlin left The Players Club citing Dykstra's unusual and abusive idiosyncrasies. Coughlin stated that Dykstra, who lived in California, would often call at unusual hours, such as 2 am to 3 am EST, and expect Coughlin to wake up and "go to work" at that hour. These and many other unusual experiences were documented in an article for the April 2009 issue of GQ magazine titled You Think Your Job Sucks? Try Working For Lenny Dykstra  In 2009, Coughlin appeared as a guest on the HBO program Real Sports with Bryant Gumbel, following up on Lenny Dysktra's questionable business practices.

In 2009, Coughlin bought an airplane, obtained his Private Pilot Certificate, and established an aerial cinematography company called All Island Aerial. Kevin P. Coughlin is considered a prominent authority on the use of unmanned aerial vehicles for aerial photography and aerial cinematography. He is a former director of photography member of the International Cinematographers Guild'', I.A.T.S.E. Local 600 and worked on feature films and television shows as an aerial cinematographer. From 2014 to 2022, Coughlin has been the executive photographer in the office of New York Governor and the Chief sUAS Pilot for the State of New York. He is currently a Senior Technical Photographer / Videographer with the United States Department of Energy.

On October 8, 2022, Coughlin was awarded a New York Emmy Award as an aerial videographer for his contribution to the Newsday online documentary: On the Shoulders of Giants. In this documentary, Newsday chronicles the murder of George Floyd and the 8 minutes 46 seconds that Derek Chauvin, a white Minneapolis police officer, spent kneeling on his neck. Floyd's murder set off a firestorm of protest and a cry for social justice on Long Island and across the nation.

References

External links
 Official web site

Living people
American photojournalists
Place of birth missing (living people)
Year of birth missing (living people)